The Count of Luxemburg is a 1972 German musical comedy film directed by Wolfgang Glück and starring Eberhard Wächter, Lilian Sukis and Erich Kunz. It is an adaptation of the operetta Der Graf von Luxemburg by Franz Lehár.

Cast

References

External links

1972 films
1970s musical comedy films
German musical comedy films
West German films
1970s German-language films
Operetta films
Films based on operettas
Films set in the 1900s
Films set in Paris
German historical comedy films
1970s historical comedy films
1970s historical musical films
German historical musical films
1972 comedy films
1970s German films